Tinashe Marowa (born 23 January 1997) is a New Zealand professional footballer who currently plays as striker for North Shore United.

Early life
Marowa was born in Harare, Zimbabwe, where his father was a car mechanic, and arrived in New Zealand aged eight. He learnt English only after arriving in Nelson, at Nelson Central School.

Playing career

Club
Marowa joined Tasman United in October 2016 to play in the New Zealand Football Championship. He enjoyed a breakthrough season for Tasman United in the 2016–17 New Zealand Football Championship, the club's inaugural season.

Marowa joined Wellington Phoenix for a two-week trial in March 2017. Despite not resulting in a first-team contract, Marowa did move into the Phoenix's development program following the trial.

He made his professional debut for Wellington on 1 August 2017 in a round of 32 FFA Cup match against A-League side Western Sydney Wanderers.

After missing out on one of the professional contracts for the Wellington Phoenix, Marowa who instead of staying with Wellington to play for their reserves side, decided to return to Tasman United for the 2017–18 ISPS Handa Premiership.

International
Marowa was first called up to the New Zealand under-20 national team squad for a training camp in early 2017. He was a surprise omission from the squad for the 2017 FIFA U-20 World Cup after featuring in training squads in the lead-up to the tournament.

References

External links

1997 births
Living people
Association football forwards
New Zealand association footballers
Milwaukee Panthers men's soccer players
Wellington Phoenix FC players
New Zealand Football Championship players
Zimbabwean emigrants to New Zealand
Tasman United players
North Shore United AFC players